The men's individual cross country event was part of the track and field athletics programme at the 1920 Summer Olympics. It was the second appearance of this event. The competition was held on Monday, August 23, 1920. Forty-seven runners from 12 nations competed.

Results

The first three runners for each nation to finish in this event were also counted towards the cross country team result.

References

External links
 
 

Cross country individual
1920